Lemnitz is a municipality in Saale-Orla-Kreis, Thuringia, Germany, on the edge of the Thuringian Forest. The town is a member of the municipal association Triptis.

Notable people
Albert Abicht (1893–1973) - politician

References

Saale-Orla-Kreis
Grand Duchy of Saxe-Weimar-Eisenach